Byford Secondary College is an Independent Public secondary school in Byford, a suburb  south-east of Perth, Western Australia.

Overview
Stage one of the construction of Byford Secondary College opened in February 2014, and cost $35.2 million. Stage two opened in July 2016, and cost $14 million. Facilities included in that stage are an education support facility, arts centre, gymnasium and extension of the technologies building. The third and final stage opened in September 2017, two years ahead of schedule. The third stage included a double storey senior school building for Year 11 and 12 students, a staffroom, student services area, 3 information technology laboratories, 75-seat lecture theatre, 15 general classrooms and 2 educational support classrooms. The final stage cost $15.9 million.

Byford Secondary College opened to Year 8 students in 2014. An additional year group was added to the school each year after that, up until Year 12 in 2018. In addition, the school opened to Year 7 students in 2015, alongside most other public secondary schools in Western Australia. By 2018, the school had students from Year 7 to Year 12.

In March 2017, it was revealed that the educational support facility's $700,000 pool had not been used in the 9 months since it had been competed. Staff were not trained and accredited for using the pool until October 2016, and by then, the pool's heating system had to be replaced due to corrosion being detected. After it became usable, there were no students with a disability that required hydrotherapy. The principal stated, however, that students with those needs may enrol in the future now that the pool is operational. The president of the State Schools Teachers Union criticised that money was spent on a pool that is barely being used, when other schools find it hard to get good facilities.

In the 2021 Budget it was reported the College would receive an additional classroom block including STEM facilities valued at $21.5 million.

Michelle Barret was named the 2021 WA Education Assistant of the Year.

Academic results
2018 was the first year that Year 12 students graduated from Byford Secondary College.

Student numbers

See also

 List of schools in the Perth metropolitan area

References

External links
 Byford Secondary College website
 Annual school reports (2014 – 2018)
 Department of Education, Schools Online, Byford Secondary College (4193)

Public high schools in Perth, Western Australia
Educational institutions established in 2014
2014 establishments in Australia
Byford, Western Australia